Provincial road N701 (N701) is a road connecting the city of Lelystad with Rijksweg 6 (A6) in Almere.

External links

701
701